Víctor Li-Carrillo Chía (1929–1988) was a Peruvian philosopher.

Education and influences
He studied at the Universidad Nacional Mayor de San Marcos, then in France (1951-1954) and Germany (1954-1958). On these trips he met Victor Goldschmidt and Martin Heidegger, among other famous names in philosophy and world culture. In this first part of his life his philosophical interests were focused on ancient Greek philosophy and language, as well as being heavily influenced by Heidegger, whom he recognizes as a teacher.

References

Peruvian philosophers
1929 births
1988 deaths
20th-century philosophers
National University of San Marcos alumni
Academic staff of the National University of San Marcos